Steven Gardiner (born 12 September 1995) is a Bahamian track and field sprinter competing in the 400 metres and 200 metres. He is the current Olympic and world champion in the 400 m, and also won the silver medal at the 2017 World Championships in that event. His winning time of 43.48 s from the 2019 World Championships is the Bahamian record and makes him the sixth-fastest man in the history of the event. Gardiner also owns the Bahamian records in the outdoor 300 m and 200 m, with times of 31.83 s and 19.75 s respectively, and the world best in the indoor 300 m at 31.56 s.

Early life
Gardiner was born in Murphy Town, Central Abaco, in the Bahamas. During his teenage years Gardiner was a competitive volleyball player, but also ran track and field. Gardiner wanted to transition to track and field in the shorter sprints, but his high school coach said he was too tall, so he became a 400 m runner. 
He went to Moores Island All-Age School, where he was a part of the Exterminators Track and Field Club, Coached by Pastor Anthony Williams. Moore's Island is a small island off the coast of mainland Abaco Islands.

Career
Gardiner competed in the sport in his teenage years and ran in the 400 m at the national championships in 2013. He entered three events at the 2014 CARIFTA Games: he only managed fourth in the individual 200 m but claimed a silver in the  relay and a bronze in the  relay. He marked himself as one of the Bahamas' top young athletes with a win at the Bahamian junior championships in June of that year. An appearance at the 2014 World Junior Championships in Athletics resulted in a semi-final run in the 200 m and a sixth-place finish in the 4 × 400 m.

His first senior medal came at the 2015 IAAF World Relays, held on home turf, where he gave American competitor Jeremy Wariner a close run in the  relay, helping the Bahamas to the silver medal alongside Ramon Miller, Michael Mathieu and Chris Brown. He began to focus on the 400 m in the 2015 season, which proved a successful transition. He rapidly improved to become the youngest Bahamian ever, at 19 years old, to run the distance in under 45 seconds and moved up to fourth on the Bahamian all-time list with a best of 44.64 seconds. He set the time at the Bislett Games, which brought him victory on his debut on the IAAF Diamond League circuit, finishing ahead of Matthew Hudson-Smith and Pavel Maslák.

In 2019 he won the 400 m at the 2019 World Athletics Championships, finishing ahead of American favorite Fred Kerley in a national record of 43.48 s, which also made him the sixth fastest man in history after the race.

He won the 400m dash at the 2020 Olympic Games in a time of 43.85. This was the joint fastest time in the world for the 2021 season.

In January 2022, he ran the fastest indoor 300m of all time with a time of 31.56.

Statistics
All information from World Athletics profile unless otherwise noted.

Personal bests

International competitions

400 m circuit wins
Diamond League
Oslo: 2015
Doha: 2017, 2018
Stockholm: 2017
Shanghai: 2018
Monaco: 2019

References

External links

Gold for Gardiner in the 400m | World Athletics Championships 2019 | Doha Moments by IAAF Athletics via YouTube

Living people
1995 births
People from Central Abaco
People from Abaco Islands
Bahamian male sprinters
Olympic athletes of the Bahamas
Olympic bronze medalists for the Bahamas
Olympic gold medalists for the Bahamas
Olympic bronze medalists in athletics (track and field)
Olympic gold medalists in athletics (track and field)
Athletes (track and field) at the 2016 Summer Olympics
Medalists at the 2016 Summer Olympics
Medalists at the 2020 Summer Olympics
World Athletics Championships athletes for the Bahamas
World Athletics Championships winners
World Athletics Championships medalists
Athletes (track and field) at the 2020 Summer Olympics